Velly Joonas (born 9 June 1955) is an Estonian musician, songwriter, painter and poet, and a former member of amateur groups Vstretša and Pirita. 
Velly has written almost 300 songs, 30 poem anthologies and has had her works exhibited in an art gallery. Two of her best known songs are "Stopp, seisku aeg" and "Käes on aeg", the former being "not her favourite" and that she finds the latter "more akin her taste."

Joonas grew up in Tõrva, one of five children. Her mother died when she was very young and she spent several years in an orphanage before being returned to her father. She graduated from Tõrva Secondary School in 1973. Afterward, she studied at the Estonian Philharmonic in Tallinn and the Lunacharsky State Institute for Theatre Arts (GITIS) in Moscow. She was inspired to become a musician in her youth by performers Georg Ots, Heli Lääts, and  Voldemar Kuslap. She currently resides in Vahenurme and works as a teacher at the Vahenurme kindergarten-primary school. She has exhibited her oil paintings at several venues in Estonia.

References

Living people
1955 births
20th-century Estonian women singers
Estonian women poets
People from Kohtla-Järve
Soviet women singers
20th-century Estonian poets
21st-century Estonian poets
21st-century Estonian women writers
20th-century Estonian women writers